Madeleine Randel Gates (born 30 October 1998, Laguna Hills, California) is an American volleyball player, currently playing center for Dresdner 1898.

Career
Madeleine Gates' volleyball career began in Californian school tournaments, playing for La Jolla High School. After graduating, she played at the university level in the NCAA Division I, as part of UCLA Bruins from 2016 to 2018, before moving to the Stanford Cardinal in 2019, winning the national title; during her university career she received several individual awards.

In the 2020–21 season she signed her first professional contract in the German Bundesliga with Dresdner Sportclub 1898.

Achievements
 NCAA Division I 2019

References

UCLA Bruins women's volleyball players
Stanford Cardinal women's volleyball players
American people of Irish descent
American expatriate volleyball players
Irish sportswomen
American women's volleyball players
1998 births
Living people
Volleyball players from California